Habib Ishan (also Romanized as Ḩabīb Īshān) is a village in Mazraeh-ye Shomali Rural District, Voshmgir District, Aqqala County, Golestan Province, Iran. At the 2006 census, its population was 847, in 203 families.

References 

Populated places in Aqqala County